Ducreux is a French surname. Notable people with the surname include:

Daniel Ducreux (born 1947), French cyclist and Olympian
Francis Ducreux (1945–2021), French cyclist
Joseph Ducreux (1735–1802), French artist
Louis Ducreux (1911–1992), French actor, screenwriter and composer
Rose-Adélaïde Ducreux (1761–1802), French painter and musician

French-language surnames